Li Maocuo (born 20 October 1992) is a Chinese racewalking athlete. Representing China at the 2019 World Athletics Championships, she won a silver medal in the women's 50 kilometres walk.

References

External links

Chinese female racewalkers
1992 births
Living people
World Athletics Championships athletes for China
World Athletics Championships medalists
20th-century Chinese women
21st-century Chinese women